The Battle of Guilin–Liuzhou, also known as the Battle of Guiliu, was one of the 22 major engagements between the National Revolutionary Army (NRA) and Imperial Japanese Army (IJA) during the Second Sino-Japanese War.

This battle was the third of the three-part Battle of Henan-Hunan-Guangxi, also known as Operation Ichigo. As part of the operation, a major aim of this attack was to connect the pieces of Japanese-held territory, and also, to destroy airbases in the area which were housing USAAF aircraft.

In August, after battles in Hunan and Guangdong, the 11th and 23rd Armies of the IJA launched attacks towards Guilin and Liuzhou, respectively. The NRA troops defending the area were mainly the remnants from the Battle of Hengyang, and therefore, only 20,000 troops were at Guilin on 1 November when the Japanese started their attack on the city.

The government of China knew that it would not be able to hold Guilin, but deliberately extended the battle for domestic political reasons, sending food and supplies to the besieged. Most civilians fled weeks before from Guilin, which was scorched heavily by fire. Guilin had been reinforced with defences, pillboxes, barbed wire, and the Guangxi troops under the command of Muslim General Bai Chongxi. General Joseph Stilwell, who was friendly with Bai, went to great pains to send American munitions to Bai's forces. Trenches were dug amid the hills.

After 10 days of intense fighting, the Japanese occupied Guilin, and on the same day entered Liuzhou as well. Fighting continued sporadically as Chinese forces made their rapid retreat, and on 24 November the Japanese were in control of 75 counties in Guangxi, roughly two-thirds its area, and are said to have killed 215,000 civilians in reprisal and during crossfire, wounding more than 431,000.

Evaluation
After Guilin and Liuzhou were lost, most NRA troops lost morale and retreated without ever engaging the enemy, resulting in tremendous loss of materiel and manpower.   This became one of the most devastating losses during the entire Second Sino-Japanese war.

However, despite having destroyed the airbases in this region, the USAAF could still strike at the Japanese main islands from their other bases. Although the Japanese partially accomplished the goals of Operation Ichigo, it increased the area that Japanese troops had to defend, and substantially thinned out their lines, setting up a favourable situation for subsequent counterattacks by Chinese forces.

See also
 The Flying Tigers
 The Hump

References

Conflicts in 1944
Guilin-Liuzhou 1944
Military history of Guangxi
1944 in China
1944 in Japan